Pier 9 may refer to:
 Pier 9 Books, an alternate name for Murdoch Books
 Pier 9 (Baltimore), once Baltimore's arrival dock for incoming immigrants -- see .